Baruq Rural District may refer to:
 Baruq Rural District (Heris County), East Azerbaijan province
 Baruq Rural District (West Azerbaijan Province)